A Logician is an expert or student of logic

A Logician may also refer to:
 A follower of the School of Names
 A Logician Devil, a 1951 painting by Salvador Dalí
 Logician (horse) (foaled 2016), a British thoroughbred horse

See also
 Logarithm
 Logic (disambiguation)
 Logik (disambiguation)
 Logistic (disambiguation)